Lorenzo Bertini  (born 17 August 2001) is an Italian professional footballer who plays as a forward for Hellas Verona.

Career
On 7 January 2020, Bertini signed with Hellas Verona from the youth academy of Atalanta. Bertini made his professional debut with Hellas Verona in a 2–1 Coppa Italia loss to Cagliari on 25 November 2020.

On 14 July 2021, he joined Serie C club Mantova on loan.

References

External links

2001 births
Living people
People from Faenza
Footballers from Emilia-Romagna
Italian footballers
Association football forwards
Serie C players
Hellas Verona F.C. players
Mantova 1911 players
Sportspeople from the Province of Ravenna